Simonas Urbys (born 7 November 1995) is a Lithuanian professional footballer who plays as a midfielder.

Club career
From December 2018 until July 2019, he was a member of FK Žalgiris.

In summer 2019, he became a member of FK Kauno Žalgiris.

International career
Urbys made his professional debut for the Lithuania national football team in a 2–0 2018 Baltic Cup loss to Estonia on 30 May 2018.

References

External links
 
 on lietuvosfutbolas.lt
 

1995 births
Living people
People from Gargždai
Lithuanian footballers
Lithuania international footballers
A Lyga players
FK Banga Gargždai players
FK Ekranas players
FK Palanga players
FK Atlantas players
FK Žalgiris players
FK Kauno Žalgiris players
Association football midfielders